The 1974 Asia Golf Circuit was the 13th season of golf tournaments that comprised the Asia Golf Circuit, formerly known as the Far East Circuit.

The circuit had a new sponsor in 1974, General Ibnu Sutowo. Sutowi was head of the state-controlled Indonesian oil company, Pertamina, and president of the Indonesian Golf Association. In this latter role Indonesia also joined the circuit, with the addition of the inaugural Indonesian Open expanding the schedule to ten tournaments for the first time.

Kuo Chie-Hsiung of Taiwan won the circuit overall prize from compatriot Lu Liang-Huan, who became the first player to win three times in one season but missed three tournaments due to an injured shoulder.

Schedule
The table below shows the 1974 Asia Golf Circuit schedule. With the addition of the Indonesian Open the circuit expanded to ten legs.

Final standings
The Asia Golf Circuit standings were based on a points system.

References

Asia Golf Circuit
Asia Golf Circuit